Belloni is an Italian surname. Notable people with the surname include:

Alessandra Belloni (born 1954), Italian artist, teacher, and ethnomusicologist
Andrea Belloni (died 1577),  Italian Roman Catholic Bishop of Massa Lubrense 
Elisabetta Belloni (born 1958), Italian diplomat
Ernesto Belloni (1833-1938), Italian businessman, academic and politician
Gaetano Belloni (1892–1980), Italian cyclist
Gino Belloni (1884–1924), Italian fencer
Giorgio Belloni (1861–1944), Italian painter
Girolamo Belloni (1688-1760), Italian author
Gyula Belloni (1904-1977), Hungarian middle-distance runner
José Belloni (1882–1965), Uruguayan sculptor
Niccolò Belloni (born 1994), Italian footballer
Nicolas Belloni (born 2001), Argentine footballer
Robert C. Belloni (1919–1999), American judge
Stelio Belloni (1920–1989), Uruguayan sculptor

See also 
Belli (disambiguation)
Bellini

Italian-language surnames